Blennerhassett Island Bridge, with a network arch design, carries U.S. Route 50 (Appalachian Development Highway System's Corridor D) over the Ohio River and the historic Blennerhassett Island between Belpre Township, Washington County, Ohio and Washington, West Virginia in the United States. Construction of the bridge was overseen by the Walsh Construction Company of Chicago, and it opened to traffic on June 13, 2008.  The completion of the span completed Corridor D between Interstate 275 east of Cincinnati to Interstate 79 at Clarksburg, West Virginia.

Photo Gallery

References

External links

 Blennerhassett Island Bridge at Bridges & Tunnels
 Blennerhassett Island Bridge at GoBridges
 Construction Photos at Gribblenation
 E.L. Robinson Design Team of Blennerhassett Island Bridge
 Structural Technical Specs of the Blennerhassett Island Bridge

Road bridges in Ohio
Road bridges in West Virginia
Bridges completed in 2008
Tied arch bridges in the United States
Bridges over the Ohio River
Blennerhassett Island
Transportation in Washington County, Ohio
Transportation in Wood County, West Virginia
Buildings and structures in Washington County, Ohio
Buildings and structures in Wood County, West Virginia
U.S. Route 50
Bridges of the United States Numbered Highway System
2008 establishments in Ohio
2008 establishments in West Virginia
Steel bridges in the United States
Network arch bridges